Jason Paul Buha (born February 6, 1975) is an American professional golfer who played on the PGA Tour and the Nationwide Tour.

Buha joined the PGA Tour in 2000, earning his card through qualifying school. He struggled during his rookie year on Tour and was unable to retain his Tour card. He joined the Nationwide Tour in 2001 where he recorded four top-10 finishes. The following year he recorded seven top-10 finishes and won the Dayton Open en route to an 11th-place finish on the money list, good enough for a PGA Tour card for 2003. He struggled in his return to the PGA Tour and returned to the Nationwide Tour in 2004. In his return to the Nationwide Tour he recorded five top-10 finished including two runner-up finishes. He would continue to play on the Nationwide Tour until 2006.

Buha was the head coach for the golf team at Birmingham–Southern College from 2009 to 2013 and is now the Assistant Director of Financial Aid. He was also an on-course commentator for the Golf Channel. He opened Buha Golf Academy at the Renaissance Ross Bridge Golf Resort and Spa in Birmingham, Alabama in 2007. He closed the Academy to focus on coaching golf and working for Birmingham–Southern College.

Buha currently lives in Mountain Brook, Alabama (a suburb of Birmingham).

Amateur wins
1996 Eastern Amateur

Professional wins (2)

Nationwide Tour wins (1)

Nationwide Tour playoff record (0–1)

Other wins (1)
1999 Hooters Classic (NGA Hooters Tour)

Results in major championships

CUT = missed the halfway cut
Note: Buha only played in the U.S. Open.

See also
1999 PGA Tour Qualifying School graduates
2002 Buy.com Tour graduates

References

External links

American male golfers
Duke Blue Devils men's golfers
PGA Tour golfers
Golf writers and broadcasters
College golf coaches in the United States
Korn Ferry Tour graduates
Golfers from Michigan
Golfers from Alabama
Sportspeople from Dearborn, Michigan
People from Mountain Brook, Alabama
1975 births
Living people